Bandai Namco Holdings is a Japanese holdings company, based in Tokyo, that specializes in video games, anime, toys, arcades and amusement parks. The company was formed following the merger of Bandai and Namco on 29 September 2005, with both companies' assets being merged into a single corporate entity. The core video game branch of the company is Bandai Namco Entertainment, formerly called Namco Bandai Games, which develops games for home consoles, arcades and mobile phones internationally. By the late 2010s, Bandai Namco was the largest toy company by revenue and the eighth-largest video game company.

Bandai Namco owns former developer Banpresto, which operates as a toy company in Japan and was purchased in 2006, and acquired a 95% stake in D3 Publisher in 2009. The company owns the video game assets of defunct developer BEC, which merged with Banpresto in 2011 to form B.B. Studio. Bandai Namco also owns the video game rights to several anime licenses, notably Dragon Ball; in this instance, the first entry for these franchises will list the first game developed or published by Bandai Namco or a subsidiary company, even if the series did not begin at that time.

Franchises

See also
 List of Bandai Namco games
 List of Namco games

References

Lists of video game franchises
Video game lists by company